UFC 210: Cormier vs. Johnson 2  was a mixed martial arts event produced by the Ultimate Fighting Championship held on April 8, 2017, at the KeyBank Center in Buffalo, New York.

Background

The event was the second that the UFC has hosted in Buffalo, the first being UFC 7 in 1995. It was the first to be held in Buffalo since the state of New York lifted its ban on professional mixed martial arts in early 2016.

A UFC Light Heavyweight Championship rematch between current champion Daniel Cormier and Anthony Johnson headlined the event. The pairing met previously in May 2015 at UFC 187 with Cormier winning the fight (and the vacant title) via submission in the third round. This rematch was originally scheduled to take place at UFC 206, but Cormier pulled out due to an injury and the bout was scrapped.

Controversy arose at the weigh-in as Cormier, who had initially weighed in 1.2 pounds over the 205-pound limit, minutes later weighed in at exactly 205 pounds. Video appeared to show Cormier supporting himself on a towel held by a teammate, though New York State Athletic Commission (NYSAC) officials denied such allegations. After this fight, Johnson announced his retirement from the UFC and combat sports, effective immediately.

Promotional newcomer Pearl Gonzalez was expected to face Cynthia Calvillo at the event. She was ruled out of the contest on the day of the weigh ins after NYSAC officials confirmed that she could not fight in the state because of her breast implants, which are banned among combat-sports competitors. Later the decision was reversed and the fight was allowed to go on as scheduled.

During the main card broadcast, it was announced that former WEC Featherweight Champion and UFC Bantamweight Championship title challenger Urijah Faber would be inducted into the Modern Era wing of the UFC Hall of Fame in this year's ceremony, which took place on July 6 in the midst of the UFC's annual International Fight Week festivities.

Results

Bonus awards
The following fighters were awarded $50,000 bonuses:
Fight of the Night: Shane Burgos vs. Charles Rosa
Performance of the Night: Charles Oliveira and Gregor Gillespie

Aftermath
The NYSAC issued a two-month suspension for Oliveira for hopping over the cage after defeating Brooks.

On April 13, Johnson's team officially filed an appeal with the NYSAC over the controversial weigh-in of Cormier. In their appeal, they took grievance with the fact that no representative from the NYSAC questioned Cormier over the baffling notion of him losing 1.2 pounds in a matter of minutes. Johnson's team then called for Cormier to address the issue under oath, and if his testimony does not provide a satisfactory explanation, for Cormier to be fined 20 percent of his fight purse and stripped of his UFC light heavyweight title for failing to make weight. Johnson has stated that he does not want Cormier to be stripped of his title but instead be fined 20%. On June 2, the NYSAC denied Johnson's appeal.

At the UFC 2022 Hall of Fame Induction Ceremony, Cormier admitted that he "may have grabbed the towel" during the weigh-in, which is believed by many analysts to be a confession.

See also
2017 in UFC
List of UFC events
Mixed martial arts in New York

References

Ultimate Fighting Championship events
Events in Buffalo, New York
Mixed martial arts in New York (state)
Sports competitions in Buffalo, New York
2017 in mixed martial arts
2017 in sports in New York (state)
April 2017 sports events in the United States